The "From Hell" letter (also known as the "Lusk letter") was a letter sent alongside half of a preserved human kidney to George Lusk, the chairman of the Whitechapel Vigilance Committee, in October 1888. The author of this letter claimed to be the unidentified serial killer known as Jack the Ripper, who had murdered and mutilated at least four women in the Whitechapel and Spitalfields districts of London in the two months prior to Lusk receiving this letter, and whose vigilance committee Lusk led in civilian efforts to assist police in efforts to identify and apprehend the perpetrator.

The letter was postmarked on 15 October 1888 and was received by Lusk the following day. An examination of the kidney revealed the individual from whom the organ originated had suffered from Bright's disease. The author of this letter claimed to have fried and eaten the other half.

Police, press, and public alike received many letters claiming to be from the Whitechapel Murderer, with investigators at one stage having to deal with an estimated 1,000 letters related to the case. However, the "From Hell" letter is one of the few articles of correspondence that has received serious consideration as to actually being genuine. Nonetheless, opinions remain divided with regards to the letter's authenticity.

The murders committed by Jack the Ripper have attracted much attention in popular culture for decades, with several factual and fictional works directly making reference to the "From Hell" letter.

Background
The murder of Mary Ann Nichols on 31 August 1888 resulted in increased media attention focusing on the individual known as "the Whitechapel murderer" and, later, "Leather Apron". The grotesque mutilation upon Nichols and later victims was generally described as involving their bodies having been "ripped up" and residents spoke of their worries of a "ripper" or "high rip" gang. However, the identification of the killer as Jack the Ripper did not occur until after 27 September, when the offices of Central News Ltd received the "Dear Boss" letter. The author of this letter signed the letter "Yours truly, Jack the Ripper", vowing to continue "ripping [prostitutes]" until his arrest. The author of this letter also threatened to remove and post the ears of his next victim to the police.

While newsmen considered this letter a mere joke, they decided after two days to notify Scotland Yard of the matter. The double murder of Elizabeth Stride and Catherine Eddowes took place the night that the police received the "Dear Boss" letter. The Central News people received a second communication known as the "Saucy Jacky" postcard on 1 October 1888, the day after the double murder, and the message was duly passed over to the authorities. Copies of both messages were soon posted to the public in the hopes that the writing style would be recognised. While the police felt determined to discover the author of both messages, they found themselves overwhelmed by the media circus around the Ripper killings and soon received a large amount of material, most of it useless.

The letter
The letter reads:

The letter came into the possession of the City of London Police, being later transferred to the Metropolitan Police. The original letter and the kidney which accompanied it have since been lost or stolen, along with other contents that were contained in the Metropolitan Police Ripper files. Fortunately, a photograph was taken of the "From Hell" letter; unfortunately, the original of this photograph has now also disappeared. The image shown here is from the photograph.

Analysis
Hundreds of letters claiming to be from the killer were posted at the time of the Ripper murders, but many researchers argue that the "From Hell" letter is one of a handful of possibly authentic writings received from the murderer. The author did not sign this correspondence with the "Jack the Ripper" pseudonym, distinguishing it from the earlier "Dear Boss" letter and "Saucy Jacky" postcard, as well as their many imitators. Furthermore, the handwriting in the "Dear Boss" letter and "Saucy Jacky" postcard are markedly similar, but the handwriting of the "From Hell" letter is dissimilar. The letter was delivered to Lusk personally without reference to the police or to the British government, which could indicate animosity towards Lusk or the local Whitechapel community of which he was a member.

Opinions pertaining to the authenticity of the letter among those that have researched the case are divided. The possibility has been raised that all of the communications supposedly from the Whitechapel murderer are fraudulent, acts done by cranks or by journalists seeking to maintain the public interest in the murders and thus increase sales of their newspapers. Scotland Yard had reason to doubt the validity of the letter yet ultimately did not take action against suspected reporters. However, the many differences between the "From Hell" letter and the vast majority of the messages received have been cited by some figures analysing the case, such as a forensic handwriting expert interviewed by the History Channel and another interviewed by the Discovery Channel, as evidence to view it as possibly the only authentic letter.

The primary reason this letter stands out more than any other is that it was delivered with a small box containing half of what doctors later determined was a human kidney which had been preserved in spirits. One of murder victim Catherine Eddowes's kidneys had been removed by the killer. Medical opinion at the time was that the organ could have been acquired by medical students and sent with the letter as part of a hoax. Lusk himself believed that this was the case and did not report the letter until he was urged to do so by friends.

Arguments in favour as to the letter's genuineness sometimes state that contemporary analysis of the kidney by Dr. Thomas Openshaw of the London Hospital found that it came from a sickly alcoholic woman who had died within the past three weeks, which would be consistent with Eddowes. However, these facts have been in dispute as contemporary media reporting at the time and later recollections give contradictory information about Openshaw's opinions. Historian Philip Sugden has written that perhaps all that can be concluded given the uncertainty is that the kidney was human and from the left side of the body.

A contemporary police lead found that shopkeeper Emily Marsh had encountered a visitor at her shop, located in London's Mile End Road, with an odd, unsettling manner in both his appearance and speech. The visitor asked Marsh for the address of Mr. Lusk, which he wrote in a personal notebook, before abruptly leaving. He was described as a slim man wearing a long black overcoat at about six feet in height who spoke with a distinct Irish accent, his face featuring a dark beard and mustache. While the event took place the day before Lusk received the "From Hell" message and occurred in the area in which it is considered to have been postmarked, the fact that Lusk received so many letters during this time suggests that the suspicious individual may have been another crank.

Calligraphy and linguistic analysis
The "From Hell" letter is written at a much lower level of literacy than other letters purporting to be from the murderer, in that this letter features numerous errors in spelling and grammar. Scholars have debated whether this is a deliberate misdirection, as the author observed the silent k in "knif[e]" and h in "whil[e]". The formatting of the letter also features a cramped writing style in which letters are pressed together haphazardly; many ink blots appear in a manner which might indicate that the writer was unfamiliar with using a pen. The formatting of the message might point to it being a hoax by a well-educated individual, but some researchers have argued that it is the genuine work of a partly functional but deranged individual.

Forensic handwriting expert Michelle Dresbold, working for the History Channel documentary series MysteryQuest, has argued that the letter is genuine based on the peculiar characteristics of the handwriting, particularly the "invasive loop" letter "y"s. The criminal profiling experts in the program also created a profile of the killer, stating that he possessed a deranged animosity towards women and skills at using a knife. Based on linguistic clues (including the use of the particular spelling of the word "prasarved" for "preserved"), Dresbold felt that the letter showed strong evidence that the writer was either Irish or of Irish extraction, indicating a possible link between the letter and known Ripper suspect Francis Tumblety. Tumblety was an itinerant Irish-American quack doctor who was mentally ill and who had resided in London during the year of the murders. He had multiple encounters with the law and a strong dislike of women, as well as a background collecting body parts. However, after arresting him at the time as a suspect, the police ended up releasing him on bail, having failed to find hard evidence against him. He ultimately died of a heart condition in the U.S. in 1903. Sugden has also written that the author may have had an Irish background but also stated that he may have had Cockney mannerisms.

The purported diary of James Maybrick, another man who has been proposed as a Ripper suspect, contains references to the "From Hell" letter, particularly the alleged cannibalism. However, even if the diary is assumed to be genuine, the handwriting does not match that of the letter at all. A Kirkus Reviews article has referred to the diary rumor as a "hoax" that is one of several "bizarre hypotheses" relating to the case.

In popular culture

The Jack the Ripper murders are regarded as the first internationally publicised set of serial killings, with the perpetrator never conclusively identified. They have attracted much attention for decades, with fictional works referring specifically to the Lusk letter. The graphic novel From Hell, created by Alan Moore and Eddie Campbell, concerns the Ripper murders and takes its name from the letter. The work was originally published in serial form from 1989 to 1996, first collected as a single piece in 1999, and adapted into a 2001 feature film starring Johnny Depp and Heather Graham. The comic series features the actual killer as a main protagonist, going into his tortured mind and warped justifications for the murders. Cultural commentators such as Professor Elizabeth Ho have highlighted the way in which the work comments "on the present's relationship to the past", with text and image placed "in critical tension".

See also 
 Jack the Ripper suspects
 Offender profiling
 Whitechapel Vigilance Committee
 List of incidents of cannibalism

References

Cited works and further reading

External links

 Contemporary news article pertaining to the From Hell letter
 The Whitechapel Vigilance Committee on the Casebook: Jack the Ripper website
 The Whitechapel Vigilance Committee on the London Walks website 

1888 documents
Hoaxes in England
Incidents of cannibalism
Jack the Ripper
Letters (message)
Murder in London